Saint-Hélen is a commune in the Côtes-d'Armor département of Brittany in northwestern France.

Population
Inhabitants of Saint-Hélen are called hélennais in French.

See also
Communes of the Côtes-d'Armor department

References

External links

Communes of Côtes-d'Armor